Ashutosh Singh may refer to:

 Ashutosh Singh (cricketer) (born 1994), Indian domestic cricketer
 Ashutosh Singh (tennis) (born 1982), Indian professional tennis player